Alphonse Airport  is an airport serving Alphonse Island, the sole island of the Alphonse Atoll in the Seychelles. The runway is next to the Alphonse Island Resort.

Airlines and Destinations

IDC Aviation offers flights between Alphonse and Mahé. From October through April there is one scheduled flight per week. Flights depart from Mahé Airport and last approximately one hour.

See also

Transport in Seychelles
List of airports in Seychelles

References

External links
OpenStreetMap - Alphonse Island
OurAirports - Alphonse Island
FallingRain - Alphonse Island Airport

Airports in Seychelles